Vivek Tirtha (in English: Vivek Pilgrimage) or Ramakrishna Mission Vivekananda Centre for Human Excellence and Social Sciences is an upcoming cultural and education centre dedicated to Swami Vivekananda in New Town, Kolkata, West Bengal, India. Chief Minister Mamata Banerjee laid the foundation stone of Vivek Tirtha on 11 November 2014. It is being built with an aim to help people to live a life of peace and happiness.

Location 
Vivek Tirtha is located in Action Area II, New Town, Kolkata, West Bengal; on Biswa Bangla Sarani, beside the Eco Park Gate no. 1. It will be catered by Eco Park metro station of Kolkata Metro Line 6.

Details 
The Vivek Tirtha or Ramakrishna Mission Vivekananda Centre for Human Excellence and Social Sciences is an under construction cultural and education centre, owned by Ramakrishna Mission. In 2013, Government of West Bengal proposed the centre and on 11 November 2014 Chief Minister Mamata Banerjee, with the General Secretary of Ramakrishna Math and Mission Swami Suhitanandaji laid the foundation stone. It will consist of a 10-storey main building and four other buildings named after Sister Nivedita, J. J. Goodwin, Ole Sara Bull and Josephine MacLeod, the four famous foreign disciples of Swami Vivekananda. The main building is being designed like the Art Institute of Chicago, where Swami Vivekananda delivered his famous speech on 11 September 1893. It will house the administrative offices and an 1,400 seater auditorium. Other buildings will have the digital library, exhibition hall and meditation room. The campus is spread over a  area. Construction work started in March 2016, 2 years after foundation. West Bengal State Council of Higher Education and Nabadiganta Industrial Township Authority donated  and  respectively. Corporates and PSUs also donated towards the construction of the centre. Courses like personality development, communication skills, motivation for parents, stress management, mind management will be offered at the centre.

See also 

 HIDCO
 Nazrul Tirtha

References

External links 

 Official website

Cultural centres in India
Buildings and structures in Kolkata
New Town, Kolkata
Swami Vivekananda